Diodorus of Tyre, was a Peripatetic philosopher, and a disciple and follower of Critolaus, whom he succeeded as the head of the Peripatetic school at Athens c. 118 BC. He was still alive and active there in 110 BC, when Licinius Crassus, during his quaestorship of Macedonia, visited Athens. Cicero denies that he was a genuine Peripatetic, because it was one of his ethical maxims, that the greatest good consisted in a combination of virtue with the absence of pain, whereby a reconciliation between the Stoics and Epicureans was attempted.

Notes

References

Hellenistic-era philosophers from Asia
Roman-era Peripatetic philosophers
2nd-century BC Greek people
2nd-century BC philosophers
Roman-era philosophers in Athens
People from Tyre, Lebanon